Felice Alessandri (24 November 1747 – 15 August 1798) was an Italian keyboardist and composer who was internationally active; working in Berlin, London, Paris, St. Petersburg, and Turin. He is best known for his stage works, and he produced a total of 32 operas between 1764 and 1794. His other compositions include 6 symphonies, 6 trio sonatas for 2 violins with basso continuo, a ballet, and an oratorio.

Life and career
Born in Rome, Alessandri was trained at the Naples Conservatory. After completing his studies he became maestro di cappella at the Turin Cathedral. He then moved to Paris, France where he lived for 4 years. After a brief return to Italy, he came to London in 1768 where he was active as a concert pianist and two of his comic operas were staged: La moglie fedete and Re alia caccia. He then spent time in various cities in Italy and in St. Petersburg, Russia. He came to Berlin in 1789 where he served as choir master of the Berlin Hofoper from 1790-1792. Two of his operas were premiered in Berlin: Il Ritorno a Ulysse (1790) and Dario (1791). In 1792 his comic opera L'Ouverture du grand opera italien a Nankin was mounted in Potsdam. Not much is known about his activities over the next six years. He died in 1798 in Casalino at the age of 50.

References

External links

1747 births
1798 deaths
Italian male classical composers
Italian opera composers
Male opera composers
Musicians from Rome
18th-century Italian composers
18th-century Italian male musicians